The Leader of GroenLinks (GL) is the most senior politician within GroenLinks in the Netherlands. The post is currently held by Jesse Klaver, who succeeded Bram van Ojik in 2015.

History
The Leaders outwardly act as the 'figurehead' and the main representative of the party. Within the party, they must ensure political consensus. At election time the Leader is always the Lijsttrekker (top candidate) of the party list. Outside election time the Leader can serve as the Opposition leader. In GroenLinks the Leader is often the Parliamentary leader in the House of Representatives.

See also
 GroenLinks

References

External links
Official

  

 
 
GroenLinks
Netherlands politics-related lists